The little stint (Calidris minuta or Erolia minuta), is a very small wader. It breeds in arctic Europe and Asia, and is a long-distance migrant, wintering south to Africa and south Asia. It occasionally is a vagrant to North America and to Australia. The genus name is from Ancient Greek kalidris or skalidris, a term used by Aristotle for some grey-coloured waterside birds. The specific minuta is Latin for "small.

Description
Its small size, fine dark bill, dark legs and quicker movements distinguish this species from all waders except the other dark-legged stints. It can be distinguished from these in all plumages by its combination of a fine bill tip, unwebbed toes and long primary projection. The call is a sharp "stit".

The breeding adult has an orange wash to the breast, a white throat and a strong white V on its back. In winter plumage identification is difficult. Juveniles have pale crown stripes and a pinkish breast.

An apparent hybrid between this species and Temminck's stint has been reported from the Netherlands.

Population dynamics
The numbers of this species (and of curlew sandpiper) depend on the population of lemmings. In poor lemming years, predatory species such as skuas and snowy owls take Arctic-breeding waders instead.

It is gregarious in winter, sometimes forming large flocks with other Calidris waders, particularly dunlin, on coastal mudflats or the edges of inland pools.

The little stint is one of the species to which the Agreement on the Conservation of African-Eurasian Migratory Waterbirds (AEWA) applies.

Nesting
This bird nests on a scrape in bare ground, laying 3–5 eggs. It is polygamous, and male and female may incubate separate clutches.

Food
Food is small invertebrates picked off the mud.

Gallery

References

Further reading

Identification

External links 

 Little stint species text in The Atlas of Southern African Birds
 Little stint photos at Oiseaux.net 
 Ageing and sexing (PDF; 1.2 MB) by Javier Blasco-Zumeta & Gerd-Michael Heinze
 
 
 
 
 
 
 
 

Calidris
Erolia
Shorebirds
Birds of the Arctic
Birds of Russia
Birds described in 1812
Taxa named by Johann Philipp Achilles Leisler